David Owen (1754 – December 10, 1829) was a judge, land owner and political figure in New Brunswick, Canada. He represented Charlotte County in the Legislative Assembly of New Brunswick from 1796 to 1802.

He was born in Wales, the son of Owen Owen and Anne Davies. He studied at Trinity College, Cambridge, where he was Senior Wrangler in 1777 and received his M.A. degree in 1780. He was ordained a deacon for the Church of England in 1778, served as a chaplain in the Royal Navy and was ordained to the priesthood in 1787. In 1767, with his uncle William Owen and his two brothers, Owen had been granted land on Passamaquoddy Outer Island (renamed Campobello Island in 1770).

In 1787, some time after the death of his uncle, Owen came to the island to manage the family's interests. He was named justice of the peace and a judge for the Court of General Sessions and the Inferior Court of Common Pleas. Owen lobbied unsuccessfully to have Campobello Island and several nearby islands declared a separate county from Charlotte. He died on Campobello Island in 1829 and was buried in the family vault in Wales.

References

 Smith, Joshua M., Borderland Smuggling: Patriots, Loyalists and Illicit Trade in the Northeast, 1783–1820 (Gainesville, University Press of Florida, 2006). .

External links
Biography at the Dictionary of Canadian Biography Online

1754 births
1829 deaths
Members of the Legislative Assembly of New Brunswick
Alumni of Trinity College, Cambridge
Senior Wranglers
Colony of New Brunswick judges
Colony of New Brunswick people
Welsh emigrants to pre-Confederation New Brunswick